Giglio Castello is a village in Tuscany, central Italy, administratively a frazione of the comune of Isola del Giglio, province of Grosseto. At the time of the 2001 census its population amounted to 568.

Geography 
Giglio Castello is located upon a hill in the centre of Giglio Island, between the villages of Giglio Campese and Giglio Porto, and it is the municipal capital of the comune. It is an ancient medieval borough characterized by the majestic walls of a fortress.

Castello is divided into the quarters of Casamatta, Centro, Cisterna and Rocca.

Main sights 
 San Pietro (12th century), the main church of the village, it was completely restructured in 1755 in a Baroque style.
 Rocca aldobrandesca (castle), it was built by the Aldobrandeschi in the early Middle Ages and then restructured by the Republic of Pisa after the Pisan invasion of the island in the 13th century.
 Walls of Giglio Castello, old fortifications which surround the village since 12th century.

References

Bibliography 
 Marco Lambertini, Isola del Giglio. Natura, storia, escursioni via terra e via mare, Pisa, Pacini Editore, 1989.

See also 
 Giannutri
 Giglio Campese
 Giglio Porto

Frazioni of Isola del Giglio